La Michoacana Meat Market is a Hispanic-themed chain of Hispanic specialty stores and grocery stores in the United States, headquartered in Spring Branch, Houston, Texas. Rafael Ortega heads the chain, which has about 135 stores. The stores are located in an area stretching from the Rio Grande Valley to Oklahoma City, Oklahoma. A large portion of the stores are located in Greater Houston. The chain caters to Hispanic Americans. In 1999 the chain sold more goat meat than beef. The chain also operates Panaderia La Michoacana, a bakery. The chain is known for its small to medium sized stores and convenient setting offering both groceries and ready to eat food.

La Michoacana was founded in Houston in 1986.

Ortega, the owner of La Michoacana, also operates El Ahorro Supermarket.

See also

 Supermercados Teloloapan

References

External links

 La Michoacana Meat Market 

Companies based in Houston
Supermarkets of the United States
American companies established in 1986
Retail companies established in 1986
1986 establishments in Texas